The nineteenth season of the American reality television series The Voice premiered on October 19, 2020, on NBC. Blake Shelton, Kelly Clarkson and John Legend returned as coaches for their nineteenth, sixth, and fourth seasons, respectively. Gwen Stefani rejoined the panel for her fifth season, after being replaced by Nick Jonas the previous season. Meanwhile, Carson Daly returned for his nineteenth season as host.

Starting from this season, the studio version of all performances are released on YouTube Music instead of iTunes as before. Due to the ongoing COVID-19 pandemic in the United States, the bonus multiplier for downloads is not present for the second consecutive season as performances being recorded away from the studios; additionally, the entire season is filmed without a physical studio audience.

Carter Rubin was named winner of the season, marking Gwen Stefani's first and only win as a coach and Rubin as the youngest male winner (and second-youngest winner overall at the time of his victory, only behind season fourteen's winner Brynn Cartelli). After five attempts, Stefani also became the fourth female coach to win the competition, following Christina Aguilera, Alicia Keys, and Clarkson.

Coaches and hosts

 
On June 16, 2020, NBC announced that there would be a change in the coaches for this season. Blake Shelton would return for his nineteenth season, Kelly Clarkson for her sixth, and John Legend for his fourth. However, Nick Jonas opted not to return, allowing the return of Gwen Stefani after a one-season hiatus, marking her fifth season as a coach on the show. Carson Daly returned as host. 

This season's advisors for the Battles were: Kane Brown for Team Blake, Leon Bridges for Team Kelly, Miguel for Team Legend, and Julia Michaels for Team Gwen. Usher served as a mega-mentor for all teams during the Knockouts.

Teams
Color key

Blind auditions

Episode 1 (October 19)

Episode 2 (October 20)

 Kelly blocked Blake, but Blake did not press his button, so the block did not count.

Episode 3 (October 26)

Episode 4 (October 27)

Episode 5 (November 2)

Battles

The Battles began on November 9, 2020. The advisors for this round were Leon Bridges for Team Kelly, Julia Michaels for Team Gwen, Miguel for Team Legend, and Kane Brown for Team Blake. The coaches can steal one losing artist from other coaches and save one losing artist on their team. However, the team coach may only hit their button to save an artist after it is clear that no other coach is going to steal the artist. Artists who win their battle or are stolen by another coach advance to the Knockout Rounds.

Knockouts
In the Knockouts round, each coach can steal one losing artist from another team. Artists who win their knockout or are stolen by another coach advance to the Live Playoffs. Former coach Usher will serve as the mega mentor for all teams in this round. This season, each saved artist from the Battle Rounds will go head-to-head in the four-way Knockout. Results for the head-to-head are decided by a public vote, with the winner announced during the first week of Live Shows.

Live shows
Continuing from the previous season, the number of weeks of live shows consist of the Live Playoffs, the Semi-finals, and the Finale.

Week 1: Live Playoffs (November 30, December 1)

Week 2: Semi-finals – Fan Week (December 7–8) 
The Top 9 artists sing a new song dedicated to their own fans and also combine for special trios with one another. In the results, the top vote-getter from each team will advance to the finale and the rest of the artists will sing for the instant save.

Week 3: Finale (December 14–15) 
The final five performed on Monday, December 14, 2020, with the final results the following day. In the first episode of the finale, each artist performed an original song and a cover. In the second episode, each artist performed a duet with their respective coach.

Elimination chart

Overall

Teams

Ratings

References

Citations

Notes

External links

2020 American television seasons
Season 19